Roseivirga pacifica is a Gram-negative, aerobic and moderately halophilic bacterium from the genus of Roseivirga which has been isolated from seawater from a depth of 2672 m from the Pacific Ocean.

References

Cytophagia
Bacteria described in 2013